Valletta Contemporary (VC) is an independent exhibition space in Valletta, Malta. Established in April 2018, this gallery is housed in a 400 year old former warehouse in East Street,  just a few metres away from St.Barbara Bastions and Lower Barrakka Gardens.

Art space 
VC is a not-for-profit artspace on the Maltese Contemporary Art Scene. Its clean exhibition spaces combined with the traditional limestone architecture so synonymous with Malta gives this space a very unique aesthetic. The building has various levels and uses latest technology lights, sound and projections to support many forms of artistic expression. During the past few years the Gallery has offered an international programme, attracting leading artists and establishing itself on the International art world scene.

Valletta Contemporary is a member of the Contemporary art Organisation Ocula having the right qualifying criteria to be featured in their Gallery Section along with prestigious museums and galleries such as MOMA and Tate Britain.

History 
The Gallery was conceived and is run by artist and architect Norbert Francis Attard who sought to create a much needed space for experimental and original art work. The renovation of the property took 10 years to change 3 old warehouses into the space it is today.

Exhibitions 

 Here & Now (June 1, 2018 - June 29, 2018)
 Traces (24 May - 14 June 2019)

 Tabita Rezaire (24 May - 28 June 2019)
 This Land Is Your Land (19 July - 14 August 2019)
 The Spaces That Connect Us (26 July - 14th Aug 2019)
 French Idea[L] ( 23 Aug - 20 Sept 2019)
Curated by Olivier Plique and exhibiting by Domenique De Beir, Christian Jaccard and Denis Pondruel, this exhibition explored the meaning behind Freedom, Equality and Fraternity, the motto of the French Republic.

 Diktat (26 Sept – 27 Oct 2019)
 Corpus Adflictum (1 Nov – 4 Dec 2019)
 Scheherazade (13 Dec 2019 – 14 Feb 2020)
 Up to now ( Feb 28, 2020 to Mar 29,2020)
An exhibition with the participation of International artists namely Damian Hirst, Ian Howard, Dan Hudson, Mikhail Karikis, Ignacio Muv, Denis Pondruel, Richard Roth, Javier Vivas, Hans Kotter,  Brian Eno, Fikret Atay, Eberhard Bosslet and Carlos Coronas among others. Local artists participating in this exhibition were Alex Attard, Gabriel Caruana, Teresa Sciberras, Ryan Falzon, Aaron Bezzina, Kane Cali, Charlie Cauchi, Matyou Galea and Roxman Gatt along with others.

 Playful Futures ( 30 April 2021 - 6 June 2021)
An Exhibition curated by Elyse Tonna featuring the works of Laura Besançon, Tom Lovelace, Tom Medwell, Ignacio Barrios, Dawoon Kim and Gokhan Tanriover. The first exhibition for 2021 after being closed due to COVID-19 restrictive measures.

VC Editions 
Curated by the Gallery's Founder, VC Editions is an initiative that supports selected local and international contemporary artists through commissioning the production of contemporary art pieces. Specific pieces are chosen in consultation with the artist and the gallery. The piece is reproduced in numbered editions and made available for sale exclusively through Valletta Contemporary.  VC Editions is an ongoing project with works of art moving through the collection making it a collection in motion.  The Collection features works by various artists namely Carlos Coronas, Eberhard Bosslet, Shawn Maximo, Matthew Attard, Eric Meier, Christian Jaccard, Norbert Francis Attard, Aaron Bezzina, Charlie Cauchi, Alex Attard and Maxine Attard.

Events 
The MET(a) Gala was an event held at Valletta Contemporary in December 2019. Inspired by New York's world famous Met Gala, this event brought the worlds of contemporary art and fashion in Malta.  Playing on the name of its META foundation, the MET(a) Gala brought together a number of Maltese creatives whose sole aim was to help support this non-profit space that exposes the talents on the contemporary art scene. Billed as the Red carpet event of the year, this one-night fundraising event was held on the 14th of December 2019. Leading innovators in food, design, fashion, architecture, and art creatives came together to create an event that was covered extensively by the media.

Malta International Contemporary Art Space hosted the Micas International Art Weekend in October 2019. Valletta Contemporary was one of the venues chosen to host a number of speakers one of which was Sir Norman Foster. as part of this Art weekend. German artist Eric Meier was exhibiting concurrently with in his solo exhibition Diktat.

References

External links 

Buildings and structures in Valletta
Contemporary art galleries in Europe